The 2016 Wests Tigers season saw the club compete in the National Rugby League's 2016 Telstra Premiership. They also competed in the 2016 NRL Auckland Nines tournament.

2016 results

Ladder

Other teams

NSW Cup squad

Holden Cup squad

References
Ref 1#

https://matchcentre.nrl.com/match/2016/111/20161110140/#match-report

Wests Tigers seasons
Wests Tigers season